Bandido (born April 17, 1995) is a Mexican luchador enmascarado (masked professional wrestler), who is currently signed to All Elite Wrestling. He is primarily known for his work in the promotions Lucha Libre Elite (LLE), The Crash Lucha Libre and Dragon Gate (DG). He is also known for his work in Ring of Honor, where he is a former one-time ROH World Champion.

He is a fourth-generation wrestler, a relative of Apóstol Jr., Myzteziz Jr., and cousin of Magia Blanca. Bandido's real name is not publicly known, which is often the case with masked wrestlers in Mexico.

Bandido previously worked under the ring names "Magnífico II" and "Cielito" but since 2016, he has used the ring character Bandido, who wears a mask that incorporates a bandana covering the lower part of his face in the style of Wild West outlaw. Bandido regularly teams with Flamita, forming a duo known as "Mexa Blood". Bandido is a one time PWG World Champion, and with Flamita and Rey Horus he has held the ROH World Six-Man Tag Team Championship. He is the winner of PWG's 2019 Battle of Los Angeles, and ROH's 2021 Survival of the Fittest tournaments and one time ROH World Champion.

Personal life 
Bandido was born on April 17, 1995, in Torreón, Coahuila, Mexico. He is the grandson of Julián Arellano Orihuela—who is known as "Tony Arellano"—and the great-grandson of Julián Arellano Varela, who was known under the ring name "El Húngaro" ("The Hungarian"). Bandido's cousin Magia Blanca is also a professional wrestler in the Consejo Mundial de Lucha Libre promotion. He is also related to Myzteziz Jr. who wrestles in Lucha Libre AAA Worldwide.

Professional wrestling career 
The wrestler later known as Bandido began training in the wrestling school Consejo Mundial de Lucha Libre in Mexico City, where he was primarily trained by Franco Columbo, Hijo del Gladiador and Último Guerrero for his in-ring debut. Because Bandido has never been unmasked in the ring, his birth name is not a matter of public knowledge, a tradition in Mexico for masked wrestlers.

Magnífico II (2011–2016) 
For his debut, Bandido adopted the ring name "Magnífico II" and formed a tag team known as Los Magníficos ("The Magnificent Ones") with his cousin, who worked as Magnífico I. The duo worked for various promotions on the Mexican Independent circuit including Wrestling Martin Calderon (WMC), Cara Lucha and Lucha Memes. In 2015, Magnífico II traveled to England, where he worked a show that was promoted by El Hijo del Santo.

Cielito (2015) 
In mid-2015 Magnífico II began working for El Hijo del Santo's Todo x el Todo promotion, wrestling under the name "Cielito", named after the song Cielito Lindo. On October 5, 2015, Cielito unsuccessfully challenged Ángel Blanco Jr. for the WWA World Welterweight Championship.

Bandido (2016–present)

Lucha Libre Elite (2016–2017) 
In mid-2016 Los Magníficos split up and Magnífico I started working for CMLL under the name "Magia Blanca" and Magnífico II began working for Lucha Libre Elite (LLE), adopting a new in-ring character called "El Bandido". His character, ring gear and mask were inspired by the Wild West bandit stereotype. His new mask incorporated a bandana that covered his nose and mouth, a stylized "Lone Ranger"-style markings around the eyes and a horseshoe on his forehead. On November 18, 2016, El Bandido outlasted Golden Magic, Argos, Emperador Azteca, Ciclón Ramírez Jr., Imposible, Eterno, Flamita, Diamante and Zumbido in a torneo cibernético elimination match to become the first Lucha Libre Elite Welterweight Champion. LLE closed 2017, but Bandido defended the LLE Welterweight Championship at least once after the promotion closed.

Independent circuit (2016–present) 

On September 28, 2017, Bandido defeated Ángel Blanco Jr. to win the WWA World Welterweight Championship in a show in Aguascalientes. In December, 2017 Bandido and Laredo Kid outlasted Perro Callejero Jr., Apando Negro Jr., Bestia 666, Crazy Latino, Dr. Polux, Emperador Azteca, Extreme Tiger, Murciélago Plateado Jr. and Rey Horus to win the G21 Torneo Gran Alternativa tournament.

Starting in 2018, Bandido started to work more for promotions outside Mexico, primarily in the United States, where he often teamed with Flamita under the team name "MexaBlood". Through Flamita's contacts in Japan, Bandido worked his first two tours with Dragon Gate in January and June 2018. During the British promotion Progress Wrestling's tour of the United States, Bandido and Flamita defeated A. R. Fox and Chris Brookes to win the Progress Tag Team Championship. Bandido teamed up with Rey Mysterio and Rey Fénix in the main event of the Indy wrestling super show All In, losing to The Golden Elite team of Kota Ibushi and The Young Bucks (Matt Jackson and Nick Jackson). MexaBlood traveled to England at the end of September 2018 to work once more for Progress Wrestling. On September 30, the duo lost the Progress Tag Team Championship to Aussie Open (Kyle Fletcher and Mark Davis).

In March 2020, Bandido participated in the 2020 16 Carat Gold, held by Westside Xtreme Wrestling (wXw). On night one, he defeated Julian Pace in the first round. On night two, Mike Bailey defeated him in the quarter-final. The match was well received by the crowd in attendance, who pelted the two men with coins and notes in appreciation. On night three, Bandido teamed with Pace and Jeff Cobb, defeated the team of Black Taurus, Hektor Invictus and Puma King.

The Crash Lucha Libre (2017–present) 
Bandido came to Mexican national attention through his work for The Crash Lucha Libre as the promotion began expanding to touring nationally. His debut with the promotion was on November 29, 2017, where Bandido, Damián 666 and M-ximo lost to the team of Bestia 666, Garza Jr. and Mr. 450. On March 17, 2018, Bandido and Flamita defeated the teams Aeroboy and Séptimo Dragón, and The Rascalz (Dezmond Xavier and Zachary Wentz) to win the vacant The Crash Tag Team Championship. Two months later, Bandido became a double champion in The Crash when he won The Crash Cruiserweight Championship, defeating Dezmond Xavier and Laredo Kid for the vacant championship. Mexa Blood were stripped of the tag team championship on October 7 for reasons that were never made public. On March 23, 2019, Jonathan Gresham won The Crash Cruiserweight Championship from Bandido; the match also included Flamita and Shane Strickland. After losing the cruiserweight title, Bandido challenged Rey Horus for The Crash Heavyweight Championship on July 5 and lost. In November 2019, Bandido defeated Rey Horus and Marty Scurll to win the heavyweight championship in a show in Tijuana.

Pro Wrestling Guerrilla (2018–present) 
On March 23, 2018, at the "Time Is A Flat Circle" event, Bandido made his Pro Wrestling Guerrilla (PWG) debut, losing in a tag team effort with Flamita against The Rascalz (Zachary Wentz and Dezmond Xavier). He was brought back for All-Star Weekend 14, which took place during the month of April. Bandido lost against Taiji Ishimori on Night One but went on to gain his first PWG victory against Rey Horus the next evening. His winning streak continued into May, when Bandido defeated Robbie Eagles at Bask in His Glory. Bandido kept winning consecutive matches after entering PWG's annual Battle of Los Angeles (BOLA) tournament. He defeated T-Hawk in the opening round, Flamita in the quarterfinals, and Joey Janela in the semifinals. Entering the final round, he was the last man eliminated by eventual winner Jeff Cobb. After his national exposure in the tournament, it was reported that WWE, the world's largest wrestling promotion, was interested in signing Bandido to a full-time contract. In October, he defeated Rey Fénix at Smokey and the Bandido.

On September 19, 20, and 22; Bandido participated in the 2019 Pro Wrestling Guerrilla Battle of Los Angeles.  He defeated Puma King in the first round (which was also for the Ironman Heavymetalweight Championship), Brody King in the quarterfinals, and Dragon Lee in the semi-finals.  He defeated David and Jonathan Gresham in a three-way elimination match final to win the Battle of Los Angeles. After his BOLA victory, Bandido went on to defeat Jeff Cobb on December 20, to win the PWG World Championship. He would retain the title until May 1, 2022, when he lost it against Daniel Garcia.

Lucha Libre AAA Worldwide (2018, 2021-present) 
In mid-2018, Lucha Libre AAA Worldwide (AAA) began a storyline in which LLE (no longer a separate promotion) invaded AAA. As part of the "Invasion" storyline, AAA brought in several former LLE wrestlers including Bandido, who with Flamita and Aramís made his AAA debut, losing to El Nuevo Poder del Norte (Carta Brava Jr., Mocho Cota Jr. and Tito Santana). Bandido was featured in his first major AAA storyline when he participated in a three-way match against Flamita and Fénix for the right to challenge for the AAA Mega Championship. Fénix won the match and the title match. At AAA's biggest show of the year Triplemanía XXVI, MexaBlood defeated Team AAA (Aero Star and Drago), Team Elite (Laredo Kid and Golden Magic) and Team Impact! (DJZ and Andrew Everett) to become the top contenders for the AAA World Tag Team Championship. Bandido's last AAA appearance was at Héroes Inmortales XII, where and Flamita lost a three-way tag team match for the AAA World Tag Team Championship to Los Mercenarios (Rey Escorpión and El Texano Jr.) in a match that also included Andrew Everett and DJZ.

Ring of Honor (2018–2022) 
In late 2018, it was reported Bandido has signed a full-time contract with the U.S.-based promotion Ring of Honor (ROH). In an interview, Bandido later said he turned down an offer from "the biggest company in the world" (referring to WWE) and instead chose to sign with ROH. He also turned down an offer to work for All Elite Wrestling he received around the time of his ROH negotiations. Bandido made his debut for the promotion at their January 12, 2019, television tapings, defeating Mark Haskins. He later joined a group called "Lifeblood", which was formed by Juice Robinson and also includes David Finlay, Mark Haskins, Tracy Williams and Tenille Dashwood. The following day, Bandido defeated P.J. Black as part of ROH's Honor Reigns Supreme supercard event. For many years he appeared with Rey Horus And Flamita As The Mexa Squad which they would soon win the ROH 6-Man Tag Team Championships a few months later they would lose it to Shane Taylor Promotions.

After winning the 2021 ROH Survival of the Fittest tournament to earn the title shot, Bandido would go on to win the ROH World Championship from Rush  at Best in the World on July 11, marking his first major world championship.

Bandido lost the ROH Championship to Jonathan Gresham on April 1, 2022, during the Supercard of Honor XV at the Curtis Culwell Center in Garland, Texas.

New Japan Pro Wrestling (2019) 
Bandido made his New Japan Pro-Wrestling (NJPW) debut on May 13, 2019, in a tag team match that also involved Rocky Romero and Yuya Uemura losing to the team of Jado, Robbie Eagles and El Phantasmo. He participated in the Best of the Super Juniors 27 tournament, where he defeated Douki, Ren Narita,  Ryusuke Taguchi, Robbie Eagles, and Rocky Romero, but lost to El Phantasmo, Yoh, Will Ospreay, and Bushi, ending up with 10 points overall.

Consejo Mundial de Lucha Libre (2019–2021) 
Bandido made his debut for the Mexican promotion Consejo Mundial de Lucha Libre (CMLL) following a brief stint in 2016 as part of CMLL's 2019 Leyendas Mexicanas supercard show. Bandido, Volador Jr. and Valiente defeated Nueva Generacion Dinamitas (El Cuatrero, Sansón and Forastero). For the 2020 Torneo Nacional de Parejas Increíbles ("National Incredible Teams" tournament), he teamed up with rival Último Guerrero. In the storyline of their tournament participation, the two got along for the first two rounds, defeating Flyer and Hechicero in the first round and Diamante Azul/Gilbert el Boricua in the second. During the semi-final match Guerrero accidentally hit Bandido, leading to the team's loss to Carístico and Forastero. Bandido would leave CMLL on April 10, 2021.

All Elite Wrestling (2022-Present)
Bandido made his debut for All Elite Wrestling on the September 28th edition of AEW Dynamite, where he received his rematch for the ROH World Championship, against champion Chris Jericho, but lost the match. On November 11th, Bandido signed with AEW after a bout with Rush.

Championships and accomplishments 

BodyZoi Wrestling
BodyZoi Championship (1 time)
 The Crash Lucha Libre
 The Crash Cruiserweight Championship (1 time)
 The Crash Heavyweight Championship (1 time)
 The Crash Tag Team Championship (1 time) – with Flamita
Second The Crash Lucha Libre Triple Crown Champion
 DDT Pro-Wrestling
 Ironman Heavymetalweight Championship (1 time)
 Elite Canadian Championship Wrestling
 ECCW Championship (1 time)
 Generación XXI
 Torneo Gran Alternativa (2017) – with Laredo Kid
 Lucha Libre Elite
 Elite Welterweight Championship (1 time)
 Pro Wrestling Guerrilla
 PWG World Championship (1 time)
 Battle of Los Angeles (2019)
 Pro Wrestling Illustrated
 Ranked No. 31 of the top 500 singles wrestlers in the PWI 500 in 2022
 Progress Wrestling
 Progress Tag Team Championship (1 time) – with Flamita
 Ring of Honor
 ROH World Championship (1 time)
 ROH World Six-Man Tag Team Championship (1 time) – with Rey Horus and Flamita
 Survival of the Fittest (2021)
 ROH Year-End Award (1 time)
 Best Finisher (2020) 
 World Wrestling Association
 WWA World Welterweight Championship (1 time, current)

References

External links 
 
 
 
 

1995 births
Living people
21st-century professional wrestlers
Mexican male professional wrestlers
Masked wrestlers
Professional wrestlers from Coahuila
People from Torreón
Unidentified wrestlers
ROH World Champions
ROH World Six-Man Tag Team Champions
PWG World Champions
Ironman Heavymetalweight Champions
PROGRESS Tag Team Champions